Hae-jin is a Korean unisex given name. Its meaning varies based on the hanja used to write each syllable of the name. There are 23 hanja with the reading "hae" and 48 hanja with the reading "jin" on the South Korean government's official list of hanja which may be used in given names.

People with this name include:

Yoo Hae-jin (born 1969), South Korean actor
Cecilia Hae-Jin Lee (born 1970), South Korean-born American female writer and artist
Cho Hae-jin (born 1976), South Korean female writer
Park Hae-jin (born 1983), South Korean actor 
Kim Hae-jin (born 1997), South Korean female figure skater

See also
List of Korean given names
South Korean government-list hanja for use in personal names, on Wiktionary:
Hae: 
Jin:

References

Korean unisex given names